Igor Vieru (December 23, 1923 – May 24, 1988) was a painter from Moldova. The artist's home, in Cernoleuca has become a museum, where visitors can get acquainted with Igor Vieru's art. High School of Fine Arts "Igor Vieru" in Chişinău was named after him.

Gallery

References

External links 
Casa–muzeu „Igor Vieru”
Vieru, David & Muzeul de Istorie, Muzeul de Artă...

1923 births
1988 deaths
People from Dondușeni District
Moldovan painters
20th-century Moldovan painters
Soviet painters